HMS Conqueror was a 101-gun Conqueror-class screw-propelled first-rate ship of the line of the Royal Navy. She was launched in 1855, but spent only six years in service before being wrecked on Rum Cay in what was then the colony of the Bahamas in 1861.

Construction and commissioning
Conqueror was one of a two ship class, her sister being . She was built to an 1852 design from the Surveyor’s Department and ordered from Devonport Dockyard on 16 November 1852. She was laid down on 25 July 1853, launched on 2 May 1855 and commissioned on 9 April 1856. She cost a total of £171,116, with £91,244 spent on her hull and a further £50,919 spent on her machinery, from John Penn & Son.

Career

Conqueror was initially commanded by Thomas Matthew Charles Symonds and formed part of the Channel Squadron. She was later assigned to operate in the Mediterranean during the Crimean War, and later was based out of Malta, when Hastings Yelverton took command on 22 July 1859. Yelverton was succeeded by William John Cavendish Clifford, and he by James Willcox in 1860, by which time Conqueror had returned to Plymouth. Edward Southwell Sotheby took over command and was despatched to carry troops supporting the French intervention in Mexico in late 1861. While sailing through the Bahamas, Conqueror was wrecked on Rum Cay on 29 December 1861 due to a navigation error. All 1,400 aboard were saved.

Wreck
It is a popular dive site.

Notes

References
 
 Lyon, David and Winfield, Rif, The Sail and Steam Navy List, All the Ships of the Royal Navy 1815–1889, pub Chatham, 2004,

External links
 Conquerors career

 

Conqueror-class ships of the line
Ships of the line of the Royal Navy
Victorian-era ships of the line of the United Kingdom
Shipwrecks in the Atlantic Ocean
Shipwrecks of the Bahamas
1855 ships
Ships built in England
Maritime incidents in December 1861